Ten Out of 10 is the eighth studio album by 10cc. It was released in two different versions with the original edition coming in November 1981 and the US version coming in June 1982 respectively.

Overview
After two albums of 10cc as a sixpiece lineup Ten Out of 10 was a return to the core duo of Graham Gouldman and Eric Stewart with all other contributors taking a role of session musicians, despite the fact that the album featured two of the musicians used on the band's previous album, 1980s Look Hear?: drummer Paul Burgess on all but three tracks and guitarist and singer Rick Fenn credited on two tracks but played on all other tracks uncredited. Other session musicians included pianist Vic Emerson of Sad Café, who also joined 10cc on tour. The album credits resulted in identification of Gouldman and Stewart only as "Graham" and "Eric" like on previous albums with other musicians credited by full name after the contributions of the former. The only band member photos on the album were those of Gouldman and Stewart.

The album marked the first involvement with 10cc by American singer-songwriter Andrew Gold. Gouldman said the band's label in the US, Warner Bros. Records wanted more of an American flavour to the album: 

Gold was invited to record with the band by Lenny Waronker, head of A&R at Warners. He explained: 

Andrew Gold was also invited to join the band, but declined because of other commitments:

Recording was split between the band's two studios, Strawberry Studios South at Dorking, Surrey, and Strawberry Studios North at Stockport, Greater Manchester. The recording of the album was interrupted by Eric Stewart's contributions to Paul McCartney's Tug of War and Graham Gouldman's production of The Ramones' Pleasant Dreams in the first half of the 1981.

Unlike the band's previous cover designs which were done by Hipgnosis, the cover for Ten Out of 10 was made by Visible Ink Ltd, which also created the cover for ABC's The Lexicon of Love (1982). To create the image, modelmaking techniques similar to those used in cinema were used - the front façade of the building is actually a miniature placed in front of the camera, with the people posed behind it.

Release and reception
The album was released in two variations: original 1981 edition for all the markets except US and later 1982 version exclusively for the US. The US edition of the album included three new compositions co-written by Andrew Gold ("The Power of Love", "We've Heard It All Before", "Run Away"), "Tomorrow's World Today" which was originally a b-side to "Don't Turn Me Away" single and a different mix of "Memories". The new songs replaced "Action Man in Motown Suit", "Listen with Your Eyes", "Lying Here with You" and "Survivor".

The album was preceded by the singles "Les Nouveaux Riches" b/w "I Hate to Eat Alone" (UK only release) and "Don't Turn Me Away" b/w "Tomorrow's World Today" (except US). "Memories" b/w "Overdraft in Overdrive" was later released in The Netherlands and Australia only. It was also scheduled for UK release in February 1982 but eventually substituted with "The Power of Love" a month later. New compositions recorded with Andrew Gold were all released as singles in 1982: "The Power of Love" b/w "You're Coming Home Again" (released with "Action Man in a Motown Suit" as the B-side in some countries), "Run Away" b/w "Action Man in a Motown Suit", "We've Heard It All Before" b/w "Overdraft in Overdrive" (UK only release).

Ten Out of 10 failed to chart in the UK and despite the revisions to the album made for the North American market, it did not chart in the US either. Like the previous 10cc album Look Hear?, Ten Out of 10 performed better in Europe and Canada. The single "Don't Turn Me Away" was a Top 40 hit in Canada, reaching #38, while "Run Away" managed to peak at #50 in the UK, the first band's charting single since "Dreadlock Holiday" in 1978.

Gouldman later admitted that greater involvement by Gold might have lifted the band's early 1980s output from its mediocrity:

Following Ten Out of 10, the band ended its stint with Warner Bros. Records in the US which started with their previous album Look Hear? (1980).

The album was reissued on CD in Japan in 2006 with original UK tracklisting adding the US version tracks, b-sides and single versions as bonus tracks. It was reissued in the SHM-CD format in 2008 (again a Japanese exclusive release) in 2008. Both the 2006 and 2008 reissues were packaged in mini-LP replica artwork.

On 25 August 2014 the album finally received a UK release featuring the same track listing as the 2006 deluxe edition but packaged in a jewel box with a booklet. The 2014 version was mastered by Andy Pearce. The album received a U.S. release on CD the following week of 2 September 2014.

Track listings

UK version 
Mercury – 6359 048

US version 

Warner Bros. Records – BSK 3575

Bonus tracks on the 2006 CD reissue

Personnel 

10cc
 Eric Stewart – lead vocals, synthesiser, guitars, bass, slide guitar, pianos, percussion, synthesiser strings, rock snare
 Graham Gouldman – lead vocals, bass, guitars, percussion, double bass, sitar
 Rick Fenn – guitars, fretless bass, backing vocals ("Don't Ask" and "Action Man in Motown Suit" only), backing vocals on all other tracks-uncredited, guitars on various tracks uncredited
 Vic Emerson – Synclavier, string synthesiser, piano, electric piano ("Don't Ask", "Lying Here with You", "Survivor" and "Tomorrow's World Today" only)
 Paul Burgess – drums, percussion (except "Lying Here with You", "Survivor" and "Run Away")

with
 Marc Jordan – organ, piano, backing vocals, electric piano ("Don't Ask" and "Action Man in Motown Suit" only)
 Lenni Crookes – sax on "Don't Turn Me Away"
 Simon Phillips – drums on "Survivor" and "Tomorrow's World Today"
 Keith Bessey – maracas on "Survivor"
 Andrew Gold – vocals, bass, guitar, piano, electric piano, synthesiser, vocoder, percussion ("The Power of Love", "We've Heard It All Before" and "Run Away" only)

Charts

References 

10cc albums
1981 albums
Albums produced by Graham Gouldman
Albums produced by Eric Stewart
Albums recorded at Strawberry Studios
Mercury Records albums
Warner Records albums